Joseph Greenwood (1818 – 18 July 1861) was born in St Pancras, London. His parents were Thomas Greenwood and Esther née Munden. Joseph was a soldier and New Zealand politician. He joined the 31st Regiment of Foot in Bengal, India, where he distinguished himself as a lieutenant, under General George Pollock in the First Anglo-Afghan War, and wrote an account which was considered an authority on the campaign.

In 1847 he went to New Zealand as brigade major on staff of Major-General George Dean Pitt (1781–1851), and in the same capacity served Major-General Robert Wynyard (1802–1864) on the death of General Pitt. He served in the first and second New Zealand Parliaments, representing the Pensioner Settlements electorate consisting of the Auckland suburbs of Howick, Onehunga, Otahuhu, and Panmure. He resigned from Parliament on 3 August 1857, around halfway through its second term. He also served on the Auckland Provincial Council, representing the Pensioner Settlements electorate from 1855 to 1857.

In 1850 he travelled from Auckland to Taupo, and published an account of his travels.  Greenwood owned extensive properties in Mangarei (Mangere), and built a house there in 1852.  He died at No. 21 Cumberland Terrace, Regent's Park, London on 18 July 1861 aged 42.

His son Colin Halkett Greenwood (1846–1894), was a landscape painter.

Published works

 Originally published in The Maori messenger No. 36 (9 May 1850) to 40 (4 July 1850).

Notes

References

1818 births
1861 deaths
Military personnel from London
Members of the New Zealand House of Representatives
Members of the Auckland Provincial Council
East Surrey Regiment officers
British military personnel of the First Anglo-Afghan War
New Zealand MPs for Auckland electorates
19th-century New Zealand politicians